The fourth generation of the Ford F-Series is a line of pickup trucks and commercial trucks that were produced by Ford from the 1961 to 1966 model years.  Lower and wider than the previous generation, the fourth-generation F-Series marked several design changes to the F-Series, distinguished by bed sides matching the hood line and window sill in height.  The model line returned to two headlights, a change that remained in place for over 50 years.  

Originally intended as the successor for the Styleside, Ford developed an all-new configuration, developing a body constructed in line with the car-based Ford Ranchero.  Dubbed the "integrated pickup", Ford welded the cab and body together before their placement on the frame (removing the cab-bed gap).  By 1964, Ford reverted entirely to the traditional separate cab and bed design for the Styleside bed.  

For 1965, the fourth generation underwent a substantial revision, with Ford introducing a chassis and cab that would underpin the F-Series through 1979.  The update marked the introduction of the long-running "Twin I-Beam" independent front suspension and 300 cubic-inch inline-6.  Taken from the defunct Edsel brand, the Ford Ranger name made its first appearance.    

The model line was assembled by Ford across multiple facilities across the United States, Canada, and Mexico; the model line was also assembled by Ford Argentina.  In Canada, the F-Series was again sold as the Mercury M-Series.

Model history

1960–1962

Along with the traditional separate Flareside beds, Ford introduced unibody trucks. These were originally named as the "integrated pickup" and consisted of the cab and the bed into one continuous piece, with no gap between them. The design required fewer stampings, such as the back of the cab served as the leading edge of the bed, less complicated assembly, such as the single-wall bed sides were spot-welded directly to the door sills, and the body had a less complicated path through the assembly plant's paint shop. This achieved cost savings in the manufacture of the truck, but the one-piece cab and bed body was still mounted to a traditional ladder frame chassis. Only two-wheel-drive F-100 and F-250 models used this one-piece construction--four-wheel-drive models and all F-350s, as well as all models with Flareside beds, continued to use separate cabs and beds. Styleside beds were carried over from the 1957-60 models.

1962–1964
Due to poor market reception, and rumors that overloading caused the doors to jam shut, the unibody trucks were dropped midway through the 1963 model year. The 1961/64 models have the turn signals in the grill. 1964 models received an all-new Styleside bed with more modern styling as well as longer wheelbase on 8' 2wd trucks while shortbeds and 4x4 retained the earlier wheelbases.

1965-1966
In October 1964, the 1965 F-Series introduced an all-new frame, which would be used on the F-Series through 1979. The body itself remained largely unchanged, but on 1965 and 1966 models the turn signals are above the headlights. Replacing the rudimentary straight-axle in the front was all-new independent "Twin I-Beam" suspension with coil springs on two-wheel-drive trucks. The change in suspension also lengthened wheelbases slightly. 1965 and 1966 F-Series trucks are distinguished with a "TWIN I-BEAM" emblem on the front fender. A 4-door crew cab was also introduced on F-250 and F-350 models.

The  and  straight six was introduced. With the introduction of the   FE V8, output surpassed 200 hp in the F-Series for the first time.

Argentinian-made 1961-1968 
First vehicles were made in the old plant of La Boca, in the Ciudad Autónoma de Buenos Aires. Starting in 1962, production was moved to General Pacheco, partido de Tigre (30 to the north).
Using the Y-block and Diesel Perkins engines (like the 6-305 and 6-354), the F-100 (1/2 ton pickup model), F-350 (1 ton truck model), F-500 (4 ton truck model) and F-600 (5 ton truck) until 1968, when Ford Argentina launch the "punta de diamante" series.

Mexican assembly 1965-1966 
New automotive assembly regulations and laws favoring domestic manufacture over imports were decreed by the Mexican government in 1962. After decades of Ford trucks built in Mexico from imported assembly kits, 1965 was first Mexican-built Ford truck in the recently-open Cuautitlán Assembly in Cuautitlán Izcalli. The models included the F-100 (1/2 ton pickup model), F-350 (1 ton truck model) and F-600 (5 ton truck). The F-100 came in two versions: a chassis cab and pickup truck with a like-Ford F-Series third generation bed). The trucks were fitted with the  V8 engine that was introduced in the Mexican market of Ford pickups and medium-duty trucks, producing  at 4,000 RPM. These engines were also used in the Ford Mustang that was also manufactured in the Cuautitlán Assembly in Mexico.

Models
 F-100 (F10, F14): 1/2 ton (4,000–5,000 GVWR max)
 F-100 (F11, F18, F19)(4×4): 1/2 ton (4,000–5,600 GVWR max)
 F-250 (F25): 3/4 ton (7,400 GVWR max)
 F-250 (F26)(4×4): 3/4 ton (4,900 GVWR max)
 F-350 (F35): 1 ton (9,800 GVWR max)

A Camper Special was available featuring heavier-duty components to accommodate the slide in campers that were becoming increasingly popular during this time.

For 1965, the Ranger name first appeared as a styling package for the F-Series pickup trucks. The interior featured bucket seats and a curtain over the gas tank which was behind the seats in the cab.

Powertrain

References

4th generation
Pickup trucks
Rear-wheel-drive vehicles
All-wheel-drive vehicles
Motor vehicles manufactured in the United States
Cars introduced in 1960
Cars discontinued in 1966